The 2022 Città di Forlì V was a professional tennis tournament played on indoor hard courts. It was the seventh edition of the tournament which was part of the 2022 ATP Challenger Tour. It took place in Forlì, Italy between 21 and 27 February 2022.

Singles main-draw entrants

Seeds

 1 Rankings as of 14 February 2022.

Other entrants
The following players received wildcards into the singles main draw:
  Matteo Arnaldi
  Flavio Cobolli
  Stefano Napolitano

The following player received entry into the singles main draw using a protected ranking:
  Juan Pablo Ficovich

The following player received entry into the singles main draw as a special exempt:
  Tim van Rijthoven

The following player received entry into the singles main draw as an alternate:
  Brayden Schnur

The following players received entry from the qualifying draw:
  Andrea Arnaboldi
  Elmar Ejupovic
  Gianmarco Ferrari
  Francesco Maestrelli
  Michael Mmoh
  Alexander Ritschard

The following player received entry as a lucky loser:
  Jelle Sels

Champions

Singles

 Jack Draper def.  Alexander Ritschard 3–6, 6–3, 7–6(10–8).

Doubles

 Marco Bortolotti /  Vitaliy Sachko def.  Victor Vlad Cornea /  Fabian Fallert 7–6(7–5), 3–6, [10–5].

References

Città di Forlì V
2022 in Italian sport
February 2022 sports events in Italy